Cici Kızlar (literally "Cute Girls") were a Turkish female vocal trio.

The group initially was composed of three singers, Şebnem Aksu, Birnur Bilginoğlu and Sibel Egemen. Sibel Egemen left the group due to difficulty she felt running education and music together. When they decided to enter Turkish under contest for Eurovision song contest in 1975, Bilgen Bengü was also included in the group. Their entry was Delisin (You're mad)  a dynamic melody composed by Atilla Özdemiroğlu. They received high points (second high after Ali Rıza Binboğa) from the people's jury and they shared the first place with Semiha Yankı who had received higher points from the professional jury. Turkey's entry to the contest was determined by casting lots and they lost to Semiha Yankı.

However, Delisin became a hit and they produced other 45 rpm records in rapid succession. They also played in a film named after Delisin with Tarık Akan. But the group was short-lived. By the end of 1976, they dissolved the group. Bilgen Bengü (nicknamed Kıvırcık, "curly") was the only member of the group who continued music career.. Also Sibel Egemen made solo music career between 1975 and 1993. After the last album, she left the music and began to Expert of Public Relations at Yurtbank between 1995 and 2005. She then moved to Izmir and has been academician at Public Relations and Advertising in Communication Faculty of Ege University since 2005.

Discography

References

External links 
 Bilgen Bengü website

Turkish rock music groups
Musical groups established in 1974
Musical groups disestablished in 1976
Turkish musical trios